Art of Anarchy is the first studio album by American rock band Art of Anarchy, released on June 2, 2015. It is the band's only album to feature vocalist Scott Weiland, who distanced himself from the project soon after its release. This was also Weiland's final album before his death on December 3, 2015.

Album information
On March 19, 2015 it was announced that the new album to be released on June 2, 2015 would be self-titled, and the first single will be "Til The Dust Is Gone". On January 21, 2015, they released a 2:06 teaser of the new album. Bumblefoot is the producer and engineer on the album.

On December 22, 2015, "In memory of Scott Weiland", Art of Anarchy made their album available free online for their fans.

Track listing

Singles 
"Til the Dust Is Gone"
"Time Every Time"

Personnel
Ron "Bumblefoot" Thal – lead guitar, backing vocals, production
Jon Votta – lead and rhythm guitar, backing vocals
Scott Weiland – lead vocals
John Moyer – bass guitar, backing vocals
Vince Votta – drums, percussion

References 

2015 albums
Art of Anarchy albums